Ronald Norman Soble, also known and credited as Ron Soble, (March 28, 1928 – May 2, 2002) was an American actor in films and television for forty-five years.

Early years
The son of Aaron Soble and Dorothy Turk, Soble was born and raised in Chicago, where he was Golden Gloves boxing champ in 1944 and played football for the University of Michigan. From 1946 to 1948 he served in the United States Army Airborne. In 1952, he became a U.S. national champion in the running broad jump.

Soble studied acting at the University of Michigan, graduating with a Bachelor of Arts degree. He underwent further study in New York, and performed in classical plays, including those of William Shakespeare.

Career
Soble screen debut was in 1958. He appeared in the films I Mobster, Al Capone, Walk Tall, Gun Fight, Navajo Run, The Cincinnati Kid, True Grit, Chisum, Joe Kidd, Papillon, When You Comin' Back, Red Ryder?, The Beast Within and Pterodactyl Woman from Beverly Hills, among others.

His television debut came in 1961. Soble had a recurring role on the ABC Western series The Monroes. He played a Native American character called Dirty Jim.

Other television appearances include series such as The Aquanauts, Baretta, Bonanza, Bronco, Cain's Hundred, Charlie's Angels, CHiPs, Combat!, Death Valley Days, The Deputy, Fantasy Island, Gunslinger, Gunsmoke, Harry O, Have Gun Will Travel, The Islanders, Knight Rider, Lawman, Markham, The Misadventures of Sheriff Lobo, Mission: Impossible, Not for Hire, Planet of the Apes, Rawhide, The Rebel, The Rockford Files, Sara, Shazam!, Shotgun Slade, Star Trek, The Streets of San Francisco, Tales of Wells Fargo, The Tall Man, The Texan, Tightrope!, Two Faces West, The Virginian, and Wagon Train, among others.

Personal life
Soble was wed to Elynor in 1952 for 49 years until his death. The couple had two daughters.

Off screen, Soble was active with, and served on the Board for, the Screen Actors Guild. Among other awards, he received the Ralph Morgan Award for Distinguished Service to the Hollywood Branch in 1998, and in 2002 received a Golden Boot award.

Death
He died of lung and brain cancer on May 2, 2002, in Los Angeles, California at age 74.

Filmography
A partial filmography follows.

Film

 I Mobster (1959) as Al Henchman
 Al Capone (1959) as John Scalisi 
 Raintree County (1957) as Rebel Soldier (uncredited)
 Walk Tall (1960) as Leach 
 Gun Fight (1961) as Pawnee 
 Navajo Run (1964) as Jesse Grog
 The Cincinnati Kid (1965) as Danny
 True Grit (1969) as Capt. Boots Finch
 Chisum (1970) as Charley Bowdre
 Macho Callahan (1970) as Cowboy #2
 Joe Kidd (1972) as Ramon
 Papillon (1973) as Santini
 When You Comin' Back, Red Ryder? (1979) as Sheriff Garcia
 The Beast Within (1982) as Tom Laws
 Pterodactyl Woman from Beverly Hills (1996) as Pablo Picasso
 Street Corner Justice (1996) as Chief McTighe
 ''Deuce Bigalow: Male Gigolo (1999) as Judge (uncredited, final film role)

Television

References

External links
 
 

1932 births
2002 deaths
20th-century American male actors
American male film actors
American television actors